A Bridge Too Far is a 1977 epic war film depicting Operation Market Garden, a failed Allied operation in Nazi-occupied Netherlands during World War II. Based on a non-fiction book of the same name by historian Cornelius Ryan, the film is directed by Richard Attenborough and with a screenplay by William Goldman. It stars an ensemble cast, featuring Dirk Bogarde, James Caan, Michael Caine, Sean Connery, Edward Fox, Elliott Gould, Gene Hackman, Anthony Hopkins, Hardy Krüger, Laurence Olivier, Ryan O'Neal, Robert Redford, Maximilian Schell and Liv Ullmann.

Independently produced by Richard and Joseph E. Levine, it was the second film based on a book by Ryan to be adapted for the screen (after The Longest Day) (1962). It was the second film based on the events of World War II's failed Operation Market Garden (after Theirs Is the Glory) (1946). A co-production between the United Kingdom and the United States, the film was shot on location in the Netherlands, in many of the real locations where the historical events took place.

Though it received a tepid critical response, A Bridge Too Far received several awards. At the 31st BAFTA Awards it won four out of eight nominated categories, including Best Supporting Actor for Edward Fox and Best Score for John Addison—who himself had served in the British XXX Corps during Market Garden. Attenborough was nominated for Best Direction, and the film was nominated for Best Motion Picture.

Plot
Operation Market Garden envisages 35,000 men being flown  from air bases in England and dropped behind enemy lines in the Netherlands. Two divisions of US paratroopers are responsible for securing the road and bridges as far as Nijmegen. A British division, under Major-General Roy Urquhart, is to land near Arnhem and hold both sides of the bridge there, backed by a brigade of Polish paratroopers under General Stanisław Sosabowski. XXX Armoured Corps are to push up the road over the bridges captured by the American paratroopers and reach Arnhem two days after the drop.

As General Urquhart briefs his officers some of them are surprised they are going to attempt a landing so far from their objective since  the distance from their landing zone to the bridge will render their portable radios useless. Although the consensus is that resistance will consist entirely of inexperienced old men and Hitler Youth, reconnaissance photos show the presence of German tanks at Arnhem. General Browning nevertheless dismisses the photos and also ignores reports from the Dutch underground, believing the operation will be successful regardless.

The Arnhem bridge is the prime target, since it serves as the last means of escape for the German forces in the Netherlands and a direct route to Germany for the Allies. However the road to it is only a single lane linking the various key bridges and vehicles have to squeeze onto the verge to pass. The road is also elevated, causing anything moving along it to stand out.

Though the airborne drops catch the enemy by surprise and encounter little resistance, the Son bridge is demolished by the Germans just before it can be secured. Furthermore, troubles beset Urquhart's division, since many of the jeeps either do not arrive or are destroyed in an ambush, in addition to their nonfunctional radio sets.

Meanwhile, XXX Corps' progress is slowed by German resistance, the narrowness of the road and the need to construct a Bailey bridge to replace the one destroyed at Son. They are then halted at Nijmegen, where soldiers of the 82nd Airborne Division perform a dangerous daylight river crossing to capture the Nijmegen bridge and XXX Corps is further delayed waiting for infantry to secure the town.

The Germans close in on the isolated British paratroopers occupying part of Arnhem at the bridge, and although Sosabowski's troops finally arrive after being delayed in England they are ultimately too late to reinforce the British. After days of intense fighting against SS infantry and panzers the outgunned troops are eventually either captured or forced to withdraw to Oosterbeek. Urquhart receives orders to retreat, while the other Allied commanders blame the various difficulties encountered for their failure to provide the needed support.

Urquhart escapes with less than a fifth of his original 10,000 troops while those who are too badly injured to flee stay behind to cover the withdrawal. On arrival at British headquarters Urquhart confronts Browning about his personal sentiments regarding the operation and the latter contradicts his earlier optimism regarding it.

Back in Oosterbeek Kate ter Horst, whose home has been converted into a makeshift hospital by the British, abandons its ruins. Passing through the front yard, now a graveyard for fallen troops, she and her children leave with an elderly doctor, pulling a few possessions in a cart, while wounded British troops sing "Abide with Me" as they await capture.

Cast and roles
Note: Characters ordered by rank

British

Americans

Other Allies

Germans

Dutch civilians

Production
Air filming was done in the first weeks of September 1976, culminating in a series of air drops of a total of 1,000 men. Supplies were dropped from a number of Dakota aircraft. The Dakotas were gathered by the film company Joseph E. Levine Presents Incorporated. All aircraft were required to be CAA (Civil Aviation Authority) or FAA (Federal Aviation Administration) registered and licensed to carry passengers. An original deal for the purchase of 10 fell through when two airframes were rejected as passenger configured without the necessary jump doors. Eleven Dakotas were procured. Two ex-Portuguese Air Force, 6153 and 6171 (N9984Q and N9983Q), and two from Air Djibouti, operating from Djibouti in French Somaliland, F-OCKU and F-OCKX (N9985Q and N9986Q) were purchased by Joseph E. Levine. Three Danish Air Force K-685, K-687, and K-688, and four Finnish Air Force C-47s, DO-4, DO-7, DO-10 and DO-12, were loaned for the duration of the parachute filming.

Aircraft 6171 doubled as the camera ship on most formations, with a camouflaged Piper Aztec, G-AWDI. A camera was mounted in the astrodome, one on the port upper mainplane surface, with a third camera on the outside of the forward port cabin window and a fourth under the aircraft centre section. In addition, centre escape hatches were removed to make additional camera ports available, provided that no troops were aboard during filming. A second Aztec, G-ASND, was a backup camera ship on some shots, but it was not camouflaged. An Alouette, G-BDWN, was also employed. After a mishap with G-AWDI, two locally hired Cessna 172s, PH-GVP and PH-ADF, were also used. Ten Horsa glider replicas were built, but a windstorm damaged almost all of them. Seven or eight were hastily repaired for the shoot. The replica gliders were tail-heavy and required a support post under the rear fuselage, with camera angles carefully chosen to avoid revealing this. Dakota 6153 was fitted with tow gear and Horsa replicas were towed at high speed, though none went airborne. A two-seat Blaník sailplane, provided by a member of the London Gliding Club, Dunstable, was towed aloft for the interior takeoff shots.

Four Harvards portrayed American and German fighters. Their original identities were PH-KLU, PH-BKT, B-64 and B-118, the former two aircraft loaned by the Royal Netherlands Air Force. These were flown by members of the Gilze Rijen Aero Club, which also provided an Auster III, PH-NGK, which depicted an Auster V, RT607, in wartime camouflage. Spitfire Mk. IX, MH434, depicting a photo reconnaissance variant, coded AC-S, was lent by the Hon. Patrick Lindsay, and was flown by aerobatic champion Neil Williams.

Sufficient American tanks, jeeps, and trucks of World War II vintage were found because many of the vehicles were being discarded from European military (almost entirely reserve) units, especially from Greece and Turkey.

The scenes set around the Arnhem bridge were shot in Deventer, where a similar bridge over the IJssel was still available. Although a replica of the original road bridge in Arnhem existed, by the mid-1970s modern urban development surrounded it, making it impossible to use as a setting for a 1940s city. A few scenes were shot in Zutphen, where the old municipality house and the main church can be seen. Additional scenes were filmed at Twickenham Studios.

The Motion Picture Association of America initially gave the film an R rating for its use of the F-word and depictions of war violence, but United Artists lobbied it to change it to a PG rating so that younger audiences could see the film. Cuts were also made to the film when released in the United Kingdom to avoid an AA rating from the British Board of Film Censors.

Finance
In order to keep costs down, all the star-name actors agreed to participate on a "favoured-nation" basis (i.e. they would all receive the same weekly fee), which in this case was $250,000 per week (the 2012 equivalent of $1,008,250 or £642,000).

Shooting of the American-led assault on the Bridge at Nijmegen was dubbed the "Million-Dollar Hour". Because of heavy traffic, the crew had permission to film on the bridge only between eight and nine o'clock on October 3, 1976. Failure to complete the scene would have necessitated rescheduling at a cost—including Redford's overtime—of at least a million dollars. For this reason, Attenborough insisted that all actors playing corpses keep their eyes closed.

After United Artists agreed to pay $6 million for US and Canada distribution rights, the film was a box office disappointment in North America, but performed well in Europe.

Reception
Critics agreed that the film was impressively staged and historically accurate, although many found it too long and too repetitive. Vincent Canby of The New York Times said further, "The movie is massive, shapeless, often unexpectedly moving, confusing, sad, vivid and very, very long."

James Caan and Anthony Hopkins were cited by many critics for the excellence of their performances in a film with hundreds of speaking roles and cameos by many of the period's top actors.

Generals Urquhart and Horrocks acted as military advisers to the film, adding to its historical accuracy. However, some reviewers suggested that the film contains historical inaccuracies and needs to be viewed as a 'Hollywood' interpretation of events. Robin Neillands commented, "A countless number of veterans have urged me to ignore most of the story in the film A Bridge Too Far".

Roger Ebert gave the film two out of four stars, describing it as 

Gene Siskel gave the film two-and-a-half out of four stars and wrote, 
John Pym of The Monthly Film Bulletin wrote that "by the end of this extravagant film, we have a fair idea of the who-did-what logistics of a costly military operation. The root problem with A Bridge Too Far, however, is that the top-heavy complement of stars never allows for any focus of attention."

Charles Champlin of the Los Angeles Times wrote, 

Gary Arnold of The Washington Post called it "an unusually conscientious and impressive war epic" that justified its high budget 

The film has a 63% score on Rotten Tomatoes based on 27 reviews, with an average rating of 6.10/10. The film also has a score of 63 out of 100 on Metacritic based on reviews from 13 critics, indicating "generally favorable reviews".

A "making-of" documentary included in a special edition DVD of A Bridge Too Far says that, at the time of its release, "the film was shunned by American critics and completely ignored at Oscar time for daring to expose the fatal inadequacies of the Allied campaign."

Accolades

Promotion

To promote the film, scriptwriter William Goldman wrote a book titled Story of A Bridge Too Far as a favour to Joseph E. Levine. It was published in December 1977 and divided into three sections:
"Reflections on Filmmaking in General and A Bridge Too Far". This section features some essays later  reprinted in Goldman's Adventures in the Screen Trade.
"A Bridge Too Far: The Story in Pictures" – 150 sequential photographs from the film with Goldman's captions.
"Stars and Heroes" – some of the movie's actors and the men they play tell Goldman their thoughts on the film and the battle.

Notes

References
 Arthur, Max, Forgotten Voices of the Second World War: A new history of world war two in the words of the men and women who were there, Ebury Press, 2004  
  [NB: Book has no page numbers]
 
 
 Ambrose, Stephen E. & Immerman, Richard H., Ike's spies: Eisenhower and the espionage establishment, University Press of Mississippi, 1999.

External links

 
 
 
 
 
 

1977 films
1977 independent films
1970s action war films
1970s action drama films
1970s American films
British action war films
British action drama films
British epic films
British independent films
American action war films
American action drama films
American epic films
American independent films
Dutch-language films
1970s German-language films
Films about armoured warfare
Films about bridges
Films based on non-fiction books
Films directed by Richard Attenborough
Films scored by John Addison
Films with screenplays by William Goldman
Films set in 1944
Films set in the Netherlands
United Artists films
Epic films based on actual events
Historical epic films
War epic films
Western Front of World War II films
World War II films based on actual events
A Bridge Too Far (film)
American World War II films
British World War II films
Films shot at Twickenham Film Studios
Films about the British Army
Films about the United States Army
Films set in Belgium
1970s English-language films
1970s British films